Daniel Brian Bylsma (born September 19, 1970) is an American professional ice hockey coach and former player. He is the head coach of the Coachella Valley Firebirds of the American Hockey League (AHL). He was previously head coach of the Pittsburgh Penguins and the Buffalo Sabres in the National Hockey League (NHL), and was also an assistant coach for the Detroit Red Wings. He also was the former head coach of the United States men's national ice hockey team. Prior to coaching the Sabres, Bylsma was the head coach for the Pittsburgh Penguins, whom he led to a Stanley Cup championship in 2009, just four months after being promoted to Pittsburgh's head coaching position.

Prior to coaching the Penguins, he played as a forward in the NHL with the Los Angeles Kings and Mighty Ducks of Anaheim, and coached in the American Hockey League (AHL). He was drafted in the sixth round (109th overall) of the 1989 NHL Entry Draft, by the Winnipeg Jets.

Early life
During his high school days, Bylsma was a standout in many sports, including golf, baseball, and ice hockey. Bylsma graduated from Western Michigan Christian High School where he won the Class D golf individual championship as a freshman. He also played baseball and was the starting left fielder as a freshman on Christian's 1985 State championship team. In his senior year, he was a member of the all-state all-class "Dream Team" (the best player at each position in the state – all classes), and won many regional baseball honors.

Bylsma played amateur hockey in Muskegon Junior Hockey, Norton Shores Recreational Leagues, and Grand Rapids GRAHA before playing Junior "B" hockey in Canada for the St. Marys Lincolns and the Oakville Blades of the Ontario Hockey Association. Bylsma went on to play college hockey at Bowling Green State University from 1988–1992 and was drafted by the Winnipeg Jets in his freshman year. He was twice selected to the Central Collegiate Hockey Association All Academic Team and once earned Honorable Mention. He was a Bowling Green Scholar Athlete all four years and won the Jack Gregory Award for the highest grade point average on the team in his Sophomore season and the Howard Brown Coaches' Award for excellence in his senior year. Bylsma is one of the few players in the CCHA to have scored a shorthanded goal while his team was two men short.

Professional playing career
Despite being drafted by the Winnipeg Jets, Bylsma never played a game for them, and was signed by the Los Angeles Kings in the summer of 1994. During the 1994–95 labor stoppage, Bylsma earned the nickname "Disco Dan". The nickname was adopted by teammates while playing for a minor league team in Phoenix. Veteran goaltender Byron Dafoe already went by Bylsma's former moniker of "Bysie" so the name "Disco Dan" was given due to Bylsma's penchant for dancing in the locker room.

He played parts of five seasons for the Kings, acting as a defensive forward. In his first season, when he played only four games for the Kings, he was captain of their International Hockey League (IHL) affiliate, the Phoenix Roadrunners. He also played for the Long Beach Ice Dogs, who were the Kings' IHL affiliate after the Roadrunners folded in 1997. Bylsma played 95 American Hockey League (AHL) games with the Cincinnati Mighty Ducks, the Lowell Lock Monsters, the Springfield Falcons, the Albany River Rats, the Moncton Hawks and the Rochester Americans, and reached the Calder Cup Finals in 1994.

Signed as a free agent by the Mighty Ducks of Anaheim in the summer of 2000, Bylsma was a steadying influence on a rebuilding Anaheim team, and was made an alternate captain.  In his second season, he set a career high in points (17).

Bylsma struggled his entire career to stay in the NHL, mostly due to a lack of natural offensive ability (his primary role in the NHL had always been penalty killing). Injuries took a toll in later years, and before being put on waivers in January 2004, Bylsma missed 31 games due to knee surgery. He retired from playing following the 2003–04 season.

Coaching career
Bylsma served as an assistant coach with the AHL's Cincinnati Mighty Ducks (2004–05) and the NHL's New York Islanders (2005–06). During the 2008–09 season, Bylsma coached the Penguins' AHL affiliate Wilkes-Barre/Scranton Penguins.

On February 15, 2009, with the Pittsburgh Penguins struggling to make the playoffs, the Penguins organization announced that it had relieved head coach Michel Therrien of his duties and had promoted Bylsma to serve as interim head coach of the team. At 38, he was the youngest head coach in the NHL at the time. Through his first 25 games as Penguins' coach, his 18–3–4 record amounted to 40 points—the second most of any coach in NHL history through their first 25 games. On April 28, Penguins General Manager Ray Shero announced that Bylsma had been named permanent head coach of the team. On June 12, 2009, Bylsma led the Pittsburgh Penguins to a Stanley Cup championship, becoming the 14th coach and the second mid-season replacement to win the Stanley Cup in their first season.  While the win made him just the fifth ever American-born coach to win the cup, he also became the third American in the last five seasons to do so. Bylsma was awarded the Jack Adams Award as the league's most outstanding coach for the 2010–2011 season due to the Penguins still being a contender for the Stanley Cup without his two star players Sidney Crosby and Evgeni Malkin.

On April 22, 2013, Bylsma became the fastest NHL coach ever to reach 200 wins with a 3-1 win over the Ottawa Senators. On June 30 of the same year, Bylsma was appointed head coach of the United States Olympic Hockey Team for the 2014 Winter Olympics in Sochi, Russia. On January 7, 2014, a month before coaching at the Winter Olympics, Bylsma became the winningest coach in Penguins history (233 wins) with a 5-4 shootout victory over the Vancouver Canucks. On April 4, 2014, Bylsma became the fastest NHL coach to reach 250 wins, leading his team to a 4-2 victory over the Winnipeg Jets. He accomplished the feat in 395 games. On June 6, 2014, Bylsma was fired by the Pittsburgh Penguins, shortly after Jim Rutherford was announced as the team's new general manager.

Bylsma remained on the Penguins' payroll, with no job in the organization, through the 2014–15 season. Following that season, the Penguins granted him permission to seek employment elsewhere. On May 28, 2015, Bylsma was named head coach of the Buffalo Sabres, signing a five-year contract. Bylsma was the Sabres second choice for coach after Mike Babcock, who they heavily pursued before Babcock signed with the divisional rival Toronto Maple Leafs.

On April 20, 2017, Bylsma was fired by the Sabres after two seasons. The transaction came after rumors leaked that Bylsma was at odds with many of the Sabres players, including star Jack Eichel, who allegedly stated he would not sign a contract extension with the team had Bylsma remained head coach. On June 22, 2018, Bylsma was hired as an assistant coach for the Detroit Red Wings.  On May 18, 2021, it was announced that he would not be returning to the Detroit Red Wings.

On August 10, 2021, Bylsma returned to the AHL, after he was hired by the Seattle Kraken to become an assistant coach with the Charlotte Checkers. On June 21, 2022, Bylsma was named as head coach of the Kraken's new AHL affiliate, the Coachella Valley Firebirds.

Career statistics

Regular season and playoffs

Awards and records
 2011– Jack Adams Award

NHL coaching record

  When Bylsma joined the Penguins after the 57th game of the season the team had earned 59 points. The team earned 40 points with Bylsma as head coach.
  Only 48 regular season games played due to lockout.

References

External links

1970 births
Living people
Albany River Rats players
American ice hockey coaches
American men's ice hockey right wingers
Bowling Green Falcons men's ice hockey players
Bowling Green State University alumni
Buffalo Sabres coaches
Cincinnati Mighty Ducks players
Detroit Red Wings coaches
Greensboro Monarchs players
Ice hockey coaches from Michigan
Jack Adams Award winners
Long Beach Ice Dogs (IHL) players
Los Angeles Kings players
Lowell Lock Monsters players
Mighty Ducks of Anaheim players
Moncton Hawks players
New York Islanders coaches
People from Grand Haven, Michigan
Phoenix Roadrunners (IHL) players
Pittsburgh Penguins coaches
Rochester Americans players
Springfield Falcons players
Stanley Cup champions
Stanley Cup championship-winning head coaches
Wilkes-Barre/Scranton Penguins head coaches
Winnipeg Jets (1979–1996) draft picks
United States men's national ice hockey team coaches
Ice hockey coaches at the 2014 Winter Olympics
Ice hockey players from Michigan